The plateau pika (Ochotona curzoniae), also known as the black-lipped pika, is a species of mammal in the pika family, Ochotonidae.

It is a small diurnal and non-hibernating mammal weighing about 140 g when fully grown. The animals are reddish tan on the top-side with more of a whitish yellow on their under-belly.

They prefer to live in elevations of 3,100 to 5,000 m, mostly in the Tibetan Plateau, which is where the common name originates from. The species is found in China, Pakistan, India, and Nepal in high alpine deserts, steppe and meadows, as well as tropical and subtropical montane forests.

Role in the ecosystem
Plateau pikas are considered to be a keystone species as they play a role in recycling nutrients in soil, providing food to predators such as; foxes, weasels, falcons, Asia pole cat, upland buzzard, and owls. They also provide microhabitats by increasing plant richness and their burrows provides nests for small birds and reptiles.

According to the Chinese biologists who have studied the wildlife of the Hoh Xil (northern part of the Tibetan Plateau), plateau pikas are the favorite food of the area's brown bears. In addition to its role as a prey base, the plateau pika is important for soil health in meadows; the burrowing of the species helps to aerate the soil. The species is currently considered threatened, mostly due to aggressive poisoning campaigns by Chinese populations, predominantly to eliminate competition for food with livestock.

Mating 

Plateau pikas have mating systems such as monogamous and polygynandrous groups, which contain about three males and 3 to 4 females per family along with their offspring. Females can produce 2 to 5 litters of about 2 to 7 offspring with a three-week interval in between each litter which is why this group of lagomorphs are known to have the fastest growth rates of their order. Their breeding season lasts from April to August and the young do not disperse in the year of birth. Males form hierarchies and females are usually philopatric forming reproductive alliances, helping each other in the care of their offspring, males also contribute in parental care when deterring a predator by emitting an alarm call. Pikas are social animals that live in families of two to five adults and their offspring. Males and females both contribute in protecting their family groups from intruders displaying aggressive behaviors towards others who are not part of their family.

Adaptations 

Since plateau pikas live in such extremely cold environments and are a non-hibernating species, they have acquired physiological adaptations to better assist with their survival. These adaptations include their high resting metabolic rate and non- shivering thermogenesis along with the production of leptin which is a thermogenesis regulatory hormone.

Unlike hibernating mammals, plateau pikas do not merely rely on excess body fat to combat extremely cold climates. One important physiological adaptation is their ability to alter the type of their adipose tissue, from white to brown, which promotes non-shivering thermogenesis.

Conservation and management 

The plateau pika as well as being considered a keystone species is also considered a pest because of the degradation it causes to crops which causes a competition in foraging with the livestock of farmers such as yaks, sheep, and horses, which in turn affects their livelihood. The plateau pika is an herbivore that eats plants such as bog sedge, krobesia, grasses, perennial, turf. Farmers believed that a good method to manage pikas and stop them from foraging in their land was to start poisoning programs which began to cause secondary poisoning which was believed to lead to loss of biodiversity. However the attempts in poisoning the pikas did not have a long-term effect as they would repopulate within the next breeding season and would return to the same population size. A second form of management is fencing, which also did not prove to be very successful in preventing foraging by the plateau pika. It is generally agreed that a solution will need to include improving livestock management and pest control; biologists believe that a way to accomplish this would be to gain a better understanding of how populations of pikas respond to control programs so that they can change the patterns of livestock grazing. Therefore, because of their rapid growth pikas are considered to be an animal of least concern.

References

Further reading
 
 
 
 
 
 
 BBC Nature - Plateau pika videos, news and facts
 ADW: Ochotona curzoniae: INFORMATION
 PlateauPika&Birds.pdf
 https://web.archive.org/web/20140224005514/http://aciar.gov.au/files/node/323/ecologically_based_rodent_management_part_11_53069.pdf
 Hogan_asu_0010E_10214.pdf
 Ochotona curzoniae - Plateau pika (Species)

Pikas
Mammals of Pakistan
Mammals of Nepal
Mammals of India
Mammals of Tibet
Mammals described in 1858
Taxonomy articles created by Polbot